Currently there are four churches in Liverpool dedicated to St Anne:

Church of St Anne, Aigburth, Anglican
Church of St Anne, Stanley, Anglican http://saintannestanley.co.uk/
St Anne's Church, Edge Hill, Roman Catholic
St Anne's Church, Highfield Road, Roman Catholic

Historic churches
 St Anne's Church, Liverpool (1772-1871)